This is a list of years in South Korea. See also the timeline of Korean history.  For only articles about years in South Korea that have been written, see :Category:Years in South Korea.

Twenty-first century

Twentieth century

See also

 List of years in North Korea
 List of years by country
 Timeline of Korean history
List of years in Korea prior to 1945

 
History of South Korea
South Korea-related lists
Korea South